"Teenage Lament '74" is a song  by Alice Cooper. It was released on the album Muscle of Love, and was written by Cooper and Neal Smith.

The song reached #12 on the UK Singles Chart in 1974.  The song also reached #16 on the Ireland chart, #43 on Germany's Media Control Chart, #48 on the Billboard Hot 100, and #89 on Australia's ARIA chart.

Record World said that it has "clever lyrics throughout and Alice's vocals never sounded better."

The song was produced by Jack Douglas and Jack Richardson.

Other Versions
Big Country released a version of the song on their 2001 covers album, Under Cover.
Tyla released a version of the song on the 1993 tribute album, Welcome to Our Nightmare: A Tribute to Alice Cooper.

References

1973 singles
Songs written by Alice Cooper
Alice Cooper songs
Big Country songs
Warner Records singles
Glam rock songs